Mokre  (meaning "wet";) is a village located in southern Poland, in the Opole Voivodeship, Głubczyce County and Gmina Głubczyce.

History
During World War II, the Germans operated the E316 forced labour subcamp of the Stalag VIII-B/344 prisoner-of-war camp in the village.

Transport
The Polish National road 38 runs nearby, south of the village.

References

Villages in Głubczyce County